John William Friso (14 August 1687 – 14 July 1711) became the (titular) Prince of Orange in 1702. He was the Stadtholder of Friesland and Groningen in the Dutch Republic until his death by accidental drowning in the Hollands Diep in 1711. From World War II to 2022, Friso and his wife, Marie Louise, were the most recent common ancestors of all current European monarchs.

Background

He was the son of Henry Casimir II, Prince of Nassau-Dietz, and Princess Henriëtte Amalia of Anhalt-Dessau who were both first cousins of William III. As such, he was a member of the House of Nassau (the branch of Nassau-Dietz), and through the testamentary dispositions of William III became the progenitor of the new line of the House of Orange-Nassau. He was educated under Jean Lemonon, professor at the University of Franeker.

Succession

With the death of William III of Orange, the legitimate male line of William the Silent (the second House of Orange) became extinct. John William Friso, the senior agnatic descendant of William the Silent's brother and a cognatic descendant of Frederick Henry, grandfather of William III, claimed the succession as stadtholder in all provinces held by William III. This was denied to him by the republican faction in the Netherlands.

The five provinces over which William III ruled – Holland, Zeeland, Utrecht, Gelderland and Overijssel – all suspended the office of stadtholder after William III's death. The remaining two provinces – Friesland and Groningen – were never governed by William III, and continued to retain a separate stadtholder, John William Friso. He established the third House of Orange, which became extinct in the male line in 1890. His son, William IV of Orange, later became stadtholder of all seven provinces.

John William Friso's position as William III's heir general was opposed by King Frederick I of Prussia, who also claimed (and occupied) part of the inheritance (for example Lingen). Under William III's will, Friso stood to inherit the Principality of Orange. However, the Prussian King Frederick I also claimed the Principality of Orange in the Rhône Valley, of which he later ceded the territory to France.

Military career and death

On coming of age in 1707, John William Friso became a general of the Dutch troops during the War of Spanish Succession, under the command of the Duke of Marlborough, and turned out to be a competent officer. He was present at the Siege of Ostend, commanded Dutch infantry at the Battle of Oudenarde, the Siege of Lille, and the Battle of Malplaquet, while leading al operations at the Siege of Mons. The prestige that he acquired from his military service should have favored his eventual elevation as stadtholder in the remaining five provinces. However, in 1711, when traveling from the front in Flanders to meet the King of Prussia in The Hague in connection with his suit in the succession dispute, he drowned on 14 July when the ferry boat on the Moerdyk was overturned in heavy weather. His son was born six weeks after his death.

Marriage and issue
On 26 April 1709, he married Princess Maria Louise of Hesse-Kassel (1688–1765), daughter of Charles I, Landgrave of Hesse-Kassel, and granddaughter of Jacob Kettler, Duke of Courland. They had two children.

Legacy
 Monuments in Moerdijk and Strijensas, on both sides of the historic ferry crossing across the Hollands Diep, commemorate the drowning of Johan Willem Friso.
 The Regiment Infantry Prins Johan Willem Friso (RI PJWF) is named in his honour.
Central Royal Military Band of the Netherlands Army "Johan Willem Friso" is named in his honour.

Ancestry

References

 

1687 births
1711 deaths
People from Dessau-Roßlau
Princes of Orange
Dutch stadtholders
House of Orange-Nassau
Lords of Breda
Deaths due to shipwreck
Counts of Nassau
Dutch monarchy
Dutch army commanders in the War of the Spanish Succession
Dutch generals
18th-century Dutch military personnel